The Interstate Highways in Nebraska are the segments of the national Interstate Highway System that are owned and maintained by the U.S. state of Nebraska, totaling . After the system was created in 1956, the state department of roads began construction on its Interstates immediately and upon completion of I-80 in 1964 was the first state to complete its mainline Interstate. With the completion of Interstate 129 in 1977, Nebraska completed its contribution to the Interstate Highway System.

Description
The Nebraska Department of Transportation is responsible for the daily maintenance and operations of the State Highway System, which includes the Interstate Highways in Nebraska. These highways are built to Interstate Highway standards, as such, they're all freeways with minimum requirements for full control of access, design speeds and other characteristics. Speed limits along the Interstates within Nebraska range from 60 miles per hour in the Omaha Metro area to 75 miles per hour along the majority of I-80 outside of Lincoln and Omaha.

Interstate Highways

References

Interstate Highways in Nebraska
Interstate